Zbigniew Pełczyński (29 December 1925 – 22 June 2021) was a Polish-British political philosopher and academic. He taught politics at Pembroke College, Oxford, from 1957 to 1992, and was later an Emeritus Fellow of the college. Pełczyński was instrumental in providing opportunities for scholars from Poland and other post-communist countries to study at British universities, especially at Oxford and Cambridge.

Early life and education
Pełczyński was born in Grodzisk Mazowiecki, Poland in December 1925. He fought in the 1944 Warsaw Uprising and was taken prisoner by the Germans. After the war Pełczyński settled in Britain, where he attended St. Andrews University in Scotland. In 1956, he completed his D.Phil. thesis at Oxford University on Hegel's minor political works.

Academic career
After 1956, Pełczyński made regular visits to Poland and was instrumental in developing several programmes for the education of students from communist Europe at Oxford. In 1982, he was instrumental in establishing a scholarship program for Polish students at Oxford. Then in 1986, through collaboration with the  Hungarian-American philanthropist George Soros, who earlier had established the Open Society Foundations, scholarships became available for Hungarian students at Oxford and the Stefan Batory Foundation was established in Poland. The programme widened with participation from Cambridge University, Manchester University, and other British universities. 

In the United States, Pełczyński became well known for having been the politics tutor at Oxford University for the Rhodes Scholar and future President Bill Clinton. Other famous students include prime minister of Hungary Viktor Orbán, former Polish Minister of Foreign Affairs Radek Sikorski and journalist and biographer Walter Isaacson.

Pełczyński was an honorary member of the Polish academic society Collegium Invisibile, a prestigious institution that offers tuition for outstanding Polish students.

Public and political activity
In 1990s Pełczyński was advising the Constitutional Committee of the Polish Sejm (lower chamber of the parliament), which was working on the new Constitution of the Republic of Poland. He was an advisor to the Chief of the Chancellery of the Prime Minister of Poland on government institutional reforms and was a member of Prime Minister's Council on the education of civil servants. He was consulting the European Economic Union and the OECD on government reforms and public administration in Poland.

He was the founder and a chairman of the Stefan Batory Trust in Oxford, and a member of the Polonia Aid Foundation Trust in London.

In 1994 Pełczyński founded the School for Young Social and Political Leaders in Warsaw. The organization, which subsequently changed its name to the School for Leaders Society, states as one of its goals "creating social capital based on leadership".

Published works
 Hegel's political writings translated by T. M. Knox; with an introductory essay by Z. A. Pełczyński. (1964; 1998)
 Hegel's political philosophy: problems and perspectives: a collection of new essays edited by Z. A. Pełczyński. (1971; 1975)
 The History of Poland since 1863 R. F. Leslie ... et al. ; edited by R. F. Leslie. (1980)
 Poland: The Road From Communism "Special R. B. McCallum lecture, 29 May 1982." (1982)
 Conceptions of liberty in political philosophy edited by Zbigniew Pełczyński and John N. Gray. (1984)
 The state and civil society: studies in Hegel's political philosophy (1984)
 Wolność, państwo, społeczeństwo: Hegel a problemy współczesnej filozofii politycznej (1998)

A biography of Pełczyński by his former student David McAvoy was published in 2012: Zbigniew Pelczynski: A Life Remembered (Guilford, Surrey: Grosvenor House Publishing, 2012).

References

External links
Witness – BBC World Service interview with Pełczyński about his experiences in the Warsaw Uprising
Z. A. Pelczynski, Political Community and Individual Freedom in Hegel's Philosophy of State, 1984.
 Maria Kruckzkoska, "Oksford w Warszawie," Magazyn Gazety Wyborczej, 10 January 1997
Dr Zbigniew Pełczyński OBE - Pembroke College, Oxford

1925 births
2021 deaths
Alumni of Nuffield College, Oxford
Alumni of the University of Oxford
Alumni of the University of St Andrews
Polish emigrants to the United Kingdom
British political philosophers
Fellows of Collegium Invisibile
Fellows of Pembroke College, Oxford
Officers of the Order of the British Empire
Recipients of the Order of Polonia Restituta
Polish academics
People from Grodzisk Mazowiecki
Warsaw Uprising insurgents